A graticule, on a map, is a graphical depiction of a  coordinate system as a grid of lines, each line representing a constant coordinate value. It is thus a form of isoline, and is commonly found on maps of many kinds at scales from the local to global.

The term is almost always used to specifically refer to the  parallels and  meridians of latitude and longitude respectively in the geographic coordinate system. Grid lines for other coordinate reference systems, such as Universal Transverse Mercator, are commonly placed on maps for the same purposes, with similar meaning, and using similar design, but they are rarely called graticules. Some cartographers have used the term graticule to refer not only to the visual lines, but to the system of latitude and longitude reference itself; however, in the era of Geographic information systems, this is far less common than calling it the Geographic coordinate system.

History 

The graticule is of ancient origin, being almost as old as the concept of the  spherical earth,  coordinate system for measuring geographic locations, and the map projection. Strabo, in his  Geography (ca 20AD), states that the maps in Eratosthenes's Geography Book 3 (3rd Century BC, now lost) contained lines "drawn from west to east, parallel to the equatorial line" (thus the term parallel) Ptolemy's  Geography (ca 150 AD) gives detailed instructions for drawing the  parallels and  meridians for his two  projections.

The works of Ptolemy and other classical geographers were available to the scientists of  medieval Islam. Some, such as  al-Khwarizmi, further developed these works, including creating maps on a graticule of latitude and longitude.

During the European middle ages, graticules disappeared from the few maps that were produced; T and O maps in particular were more concerned with religious cosmology than accurate representation of location. The portolan charts of the 13th to 15th centuries were much more accurate, but used rhumb lines that were much more useful for sea navigation than latitude and longitude. At the same time, however, the rediscovery of Ptolemy and other classical knowledge of the shape and size of the Earth led to the recreation of some of the ancient maps with their graticules; the earliest extant copies of Ptolemy's Geography with his maps date to the 14th and 15th centuries. Starting in the 16th Century, the graticule has been ubiquitous on global and continental scale maps.

There is some debate over whether the Chinese and other Asians knew the world to be spherical prior to Western contact, but most maps appear to assume regions as flat. Although Chinese maps do not portray any concept of latitude and longitude, cartesian grids appear on some maps dating back to the 11th Century.

Uses and Design
The graticule may serve several purposes on a map:
 Aid map users in estimating the coordinates of locations
 Aid map users in placing locations having known coordinates
 Indicate the cardinal directions, especially on map projections in which these directions vary across the map (e.g.  conic,  pseudocylindrical,  azimuthal)

These are usually secondary to the primary purpose of the map, so graticules are often drawn to be relatively low in the Visual hierarchy.

See also 
Projected coordinate system

References 

Cartography